Teofil Simchowicz (3 June 1879 – 31 December 1957) was a Polish neurologist who was born in Ciechanowiec near Warsaw, Poland. He studied medicine at the Imperial University of Warsaw, and received a medical degree in 1905. In years 1907-1910 he worked in Munich under Alois Alzheimer, studying neuropathological changes in dementia. During World War II he emigrated to Palestine.

He discovered granulovacuolar degeneration (of Simchowicz), observed in hippocampal pyramidal cells in Alzheimer's disease.

Bibliography
 Polski Słownik Biograficzny Tom XXXVII Warszawa-Kraków 1996–1997, s. 505-506 .

Polish neurologists
19th-century Polish Jews
1879 births
1957 deaths